The 1971 Algerian Cup Final was the 8th final of the Algerian Cup. The final took place on June 13, 1971, at Stade 20 Août 1955 in Algiers with kick-off at 15:00. MC Alger beat USM Alger 2-0 to win their first Algerian Cup.

Pre-match

Details

References

Cup
Algeria
Algerian Cup Finals
USM Alger matches